Raymond Caleb Ayodele Charley (27 March 1948, in Freetown – 8 May 1993, in Freetown) was a Sierra Leone Creole writer and playwright in English and Krio language.

He studied in Freetown and London and worked for the Ministry of Education.

He wrote the play called 'Blood Of A Stranger".

Works
Petikot Kohna, 1982
Fatmata, 1983

References

1948 births
1993 deaths
Sierra Leonean writers
Sierra Leone Creole people
Sierra Leonean dramatists and playwrights
20th-century dramatists and playwrights
People from Freetown

Krio-language writers